Conchatalos is a genus of sea snails, marine gastropod mollusks in the family Muricidae, the murex snails or rock snails.

Species
Species within the genus Conchatalos include:
Conchatalos canalibrevis Houart, 1995
Conchatalos lacrima (Houart, 1991)
 Conchatalos samadiae Houart & Héros, 2016
Conchatalos spinula Houart & Héros, 2008
Conchatalos tirardi (Houart, 1991)
Conchatalos vaubani Houart, 1995

References

 Houart, R. (1995). The Trophoninae (Gastropoda: Muricidae) of the New Caledonia region. in: Bouchet, P. (Ed.) Résultats des Campagnes MUSORSTOM 14. Mémoires du Muséum national d'Histoire naturelle. Série A, Zoologie. 167: 459-498

 
Trophoninae